Millerton is a town in McCurtain County, Oklahoma, United States. The population was 359 at the 2000 census.  The oldest church building in Oklahoma, Wheelock Church, is located near Millerton.

Geography

Demographics

As of the census of 2000, there were 359 people, 145 households, and 100 families residing in the town. There were 188 housing units at an average density of 105.5 per square mile (40.8/km2). The racial makeup of the town was 73.82% White, 4.18% African American, 14.76% Native American, 0.28% from other races, and 6.96% from two or more races. Hispanic or Latino of any race were 1.11% of the population.

There were 145 households, out of which 34.5% had children under the age of 18 living with them, 53.8% were married couples living together, 6.9% had a female householder with no husband present, and 31.0% were non-families. 26.9% of all households were made up of individuals, and 6.2% had someone living alone who was 65 years of age or older. The average household size was 2.48 and the average family size was 3.02.

In the town, the population was spread out, with 27.6% under the age of 18, 7.5% from 18 to 24, 27.9% from 25 to 44, 26.5% from 45 to 64, and 10.6% who were 65 years of age or older. The median age was 35 years. For every 100 females, there were 115.0 males. For every 100 females age 18 and over, there were 98.5 males.

The median income for a household in the town was $19,375, and the median income for a family was $31,875. Males had a median income of $30,577 versus $15,000 for females. The per capita income for the town was $11,168. About 21.6% of families and 26.7% of the population were below the poverty line, including 24.0% of those under age 18 and 29.4% of those age 65 or over.

References

Towns in McCurtain County, Oklahoma
Towns in Oklahoma